William Howell Waller (December 16, 1911 – September 25, 2007) was an American football player and coach.  He was the sixth head coach at Southern Illinois University Carbondale for two seasons, 1950 and 1951, and compiled a record of 3–14–1.

Head coaching record

College

References

External links
 
 

1911 births
2007 deaths
American football ends
Brooklyn Dodgers (NFL) players
Illinois Fighting Illini football players
Southern Illinois Salukis football coaches
Junior college football coaches in the United States
People from Benton, Illinois
Players of American football from Illinois